Belleplaine is a village in the parish of Saint Andrew in Barbados. It also holds the Alleyne Secondary School.

Populated places in Barbados
Saint Andrew, Barbados